The Marathon was an automobile built by the Marathon Motor Works company in Nashville, Tennessee.

History 
First built in 1908 by the Southern Motor Works in Jackson, Tennessee, it was called the Southern.  In 1910, Southern Motor Works built additional premises named the Marathon Motor Works in Nashville to produce the Marathon automobile.

The Marathon motor, a four-cylinder engine in unit with a transmission, was designed by William H. Collier of Southern Motor Works. By 1913, the Marathon was available in three different chassis sizes and at least 10 different body styles. The three chassis sizes were:
 Runner: 25 horse power, 104 inch wheelbase
 Winner: 35 horse power, 116 inch wheelbase
 Champion: 45 horse power, 123 inch wheelbase

In 1914 Marathon prices were mid-range from $975 to $1,470,()  The Marathon was popular with the public, and by 1912 was producing 200 cars monthly. 

H. H. Brooks, General Sales Manager, arranged for an Indianapolis automaker to take over sales of the Marathon in 1913 while the company was having financial difficulties.  In 1914 after Marathon went into receivership, Herff-Brooks purchased the Marathon machinery and moved it to Richmond, Indiana. The Marathon was continued as the Herff-Brooks for two seasons.

Only nine examples of the car are known to still exist, five of which are in Nashville.

Gallery

See also 
 Marathon Motor Works
 Herff-Brooks Corporation
 Marathon Motor Works Museum
 Marathon Automobiles on ConceptCarz
 Marathon Motors on Pinterest

References

Defunct motor vehicle manufacturers of the United States
1910s cars
Brass Era vehicles
Motor vehicle manufacturers based in Tennessee
Cars introduced in 1908
Vehicle manufacturing companies established in 1908
Vehicle manufacturing companies disestablished in 1914